Netraheen Vikas Sansthan  (Jodhpur Blind School) is a residential school for the blind at Jodhpur in Rajasthan state of India. It provides free education to blind boys and girls with boarding and lodging facility. It was established in 1977.

It provides the following facilities:
Residential school for the blind up to 12th class 
Hostel facility for boys and girls 
Teaching through Braille 
Provision of library and reading room 
Training by trained teachers in music 
Computerised mini-Braille press 
Special arrangements for cultural activities 
Facilities for medical and health checkups 
Scheme of industrial training for self-employment 
Arranging tours of cultural and historical places

References
jodhpur district

Schools for the blind in India
Blindness organisations in India
Boarding schools in Rajasthan
Organisations based in Jodhpur
Schools in Jodhpur
Educational institutions established in 1977
1977 establishments in Rajasthan